Mayhem Miller is the stage name of Dequan Armand Johnson (born February 9, 1982), an American drag performer and actor, best known for competing on the tenth season of RuPaul's Drag Race (2018) and the fifth season of RuPaul's Drag Race All Stars (2020).

Early life 
Johnson is from Riverside, California. She got the drag name "Mayhem Miller" from Tommy Lee and Pamela Anderson's sex tape. She started doing drag on May 10, 2002, the same year as fellow Drag Race alumna Raven and the year after Morgan McMichaels, whom Johnson worked with before Drag Race. Johnson's other drag colleagues are alum Detox and Delta Work. She auditioned for Drag Race every year beginning with season two.

Career 
Mayhem Miller was announced as one of fourteen contestants for the tenth season of RuPaul's Drag Race on February 22, 2018. She was declared the winner of the episode one sewing challenge. In episode three, she was in the bottom two and lip synced "Celebrity Skin" against Yuhua Hamasaki, and won. She was eliminated in episode five after losing a lip sync of "Man! I Feel Like a Woman!" against Monét X Change, and placed tenth overall.

Outside of Drag Race, Miller appeared in an episode of Buzzfeed's "Try Guys" in 2014, giving a drag makeover to Eugene Lee Yang as Cheyenne Pepper. She was one of the backup dancers for NeNe Leakes's lip sync of RuPaul's "Supermodel (You Better Work)" in the show, "Lip Sync Battle" in 2016. She played the character Blanquisha in the 2017 movie "Cherry Pop" with Detox, Bob the Drag Queen, Latrice Royale and Tempest DuJour. She was with queens McMichaels, Laganja Estranja, Jaidynn Diore Fierce and Farrah Moan and singer Rita Ora for the thirteen season of Germany's Next Topmodel in May 2018.

She was in the music video for Blair St. Clair's "Call My Life" in June 2018. An internet meme of one of Miller's 2011 video performances with over-exaggerated eyes started spreading in November 2018. Miller competed in the Drag Race television special RuPaul's Drag Race Holi-slay Spectacular.

She appeared in the music video for Iggy Azalea's "Sally Walker" on March 14, 2019. She also appeared in a music video for Lizzo's song "Juice" on April 17, 2019. In 2019, Miller released her very own lipsticks in collaboration with Hank & Henry. In August 2019, she was featured in Women's Wear Daily magazine, alongside Kimora Blac, Mariah Balenciaga, and Kameron Michaels.

Miller was credited as a makeup artist for RuPaul's Secret Celebrity Drag Race, making over Jermaine Fowler during the premiere episode.

In 2020, Miller returned for the fifth season of RuPaul's Drag Race All Stars, placing 7th overall. In 2021, Mayhem returned as a Lip-Sync Assassin on the fifth episode of the sixth season of RuPaul's Drag Race All Stars, where she lost the lip-sync to Lizzo's song "Phone" against Ginger Minj.

Music
Miller released her first single "Queen of the Party" featuring producer Brynn Taylor on December 7, 2018.

Personal life 
Johnson is gay. His drag daughters are Rhea Litré and Eugene Lee Yang (Cheyenne Pepper).

In July 2018, Johnson was refused services from an Uber driver in Minneapolis for being in drag. He expressed it on Twitter with support from his fans.

Filmography

Film

Television

Music videos

Web series 
{| class="wikitable plainrowheaders sortable"
|-
! scope="col" | Year
! scope="col" | Title
! scope="col" | Role
! style="text-align: center;" class="unsortable"| 
|-
| 2014
| Try Guys
| rowspan="15" |Herself
|
|-
| rowspan="5" |2018
| Cosmo Queens
|
|-
|''Whatcha Packin|
|-
| Hey Qween
|
|-
|Queen to Queen
|
|-
|Countdown to the Crown
|
|-
| rowspan="3" |2019
|The Pit Stop
|
|-
|His Vintage Touch
|
|-
| Follow Me
|
|-
| rowspan="2" |2020
|ASMR Queens
|
|-
|The X Change Rate
|
|-
|2020
|Whatcha Packin
|
|-
|2021
|YIAY TIME
|
|-
|2022
|Binge Queens
| style="text-align: center;" | 
|-
| 2023
| Kerri Kares
|style="text-align: center;" |
|}

 Discography 
 Singles As Featured Artist'''

References

External links 
 

1982 births
Living people
20th-century LGBT people
21st-century LGBT people
African-American drag queens
American gay actors
American gay musicians
American LGBT singers
LGBT African Americans
LGBT people from California
People from Riverside, California
Mayhem Miller
Mayhem Miller